Polish Ministry of Marine (or Maritime) Economy was created on 5 May 2006 during the reshuffling of the government of Kazimierz Marcinkiewicz.

The Ministry of Maritime Economy has taken over roles of other departments most notably the Ministries of Agriculture, Economy and Transportation.

Ministry of Marine Economy had an authority over:
 Overseeing of civilian navy
 Security of civilian navy
 Protection of the maritime environment
 Education of maritime crews
 Overseeing government agencies responsible for maritime matters (i.e. maritime schools and courts)
 Fishing

Creation of the ministry was criticized as being politically motivated in Polityka. because some claim that there is no need for the creation of a ministry for such a specific role.

Abolition of the Ministry

In the new government of Donald Tusk, est. on 16 November 2007, there was no Ministry of Marine Economy, which was abolished and its competences transferred to other ministries.

A similar position of Minister of Marine Economy and Waterways was again created in the Cabinet of Beata Szydło (est. 16 November 2015) and also assigned to Marek Gróbarczyk.

List of ministers

See also 
 Ministry of Transport, Construction and Marine Economy (Poland) (2011-2013)

References

Marine Economy
Poland, Marine Economy
Poland
Ministries disestablished in 2007
2006 establishments in Poland
2007 disestablishments in Poland
Poland, Marine Economy
Defunct organisations based in Poland
Transport organisations based in Poland
Fishing in Poland